The Little Bourbeuse River is a stream in Crawford, Gasconade and Franklin counties in the Ozarks of Missouri. It is a tributary of the Bourbeuse River.

The stream flows generally north passing under US Route 44 approximately three miles northeast of Cuba. It enters southwestern Franklin County 1.5 miles north of the community of Argo.

References

Rivers of Missouri
Rivers of Crawford County, Missouri
Rivers of Franklin County, Missouri
Rivers of Gasconade County, Missouri